The Peak Aerospace Me 109R is a family of German replica warbird ultralight aircraft that was designed by Tassilo Bek, and originally produced by Peak Aerospace of Pasewalk. The company since changed its name to Classic Planes GmbH . The design, first flown in 1991, is an 80% scale replica of the Second World War Messerschmitt Bf 109 and is supplied as a kit for amateur construction or as a complete ready-to-fly-aircraft.

Design and development
The aircraft was designed to comply with the Fédération Aéronautique Internationale microlight rules. It features a cantilever low-wing, a single-seat enclosed cockpit, retractable conventional landing gear and a single engine in tractor configuration.

The first replica was inspired by Bek's inspection of a Loehle 5151 Mustang scale replica fighter at AirVenture in the late 1980s. He was impressed with the scale warbird, but wanted a German aircraft and so returned home and set out to design an Me 109 replica.

The first prototype, registered D-MBAK, was of all wooden construction, powered by a Hirth 2704 producing only  and first flew in 1991. This aircraft achieved  on its low power output, but Bek started a second prototype based on lessons learned in 1992. The second aircraft, registered D-MYBB, first flew in 1992, but was lost in an accident that same year. Bek's third prototype, D-MNBP, was flown in about 1994 and resulted in some kits being sold.

Bek flew a homebuilt category version of the Me 109 in 1996, powered by a Hirth F30 and later a Subaru automotive conversion, which became the prototype of the Me 109R kit aircraft. Bek then sold the company and the new owner ceased development of the Me 109. In 2003 Christian Engelen purchased the project and continued work on the aircraft, officially re-launching it in 2004. Since then production has continued on a demand basis.

The current production version, the Me 109R is made from composites. Standard engines available include the  Rotax 582 two-stroke, the  Weber Motor MPE 750 and the  D-Motor LF26 four-stroke powerplants.

Variants
Me 109R Microlight
Version for the European microlight class with a gross weight of 
Me 109R Experimental
Powered by an  Rotax 912UL, a  MPE 750 or  D-Motor LF26 boxer engine.

Specifications (Me 109R)

See also
Roland Me 109 Replica - a similar replica
W.A.R. BF-109

References

External links

1990s German ultralight aircraft
Homebuilt aircraft
Single-engined tractor aircraft
Low-wing aircraft